Artur Tupits (8 October 1892 Puurmani Parish (now Põltsamaa Parish), Kreis Dorpat – 28 October 1941 Ussolye prison camp, Perm Oblast, Russian SFSR) was an Estonian politician. He was a member of I Riigikogu.

1932–1933, 1938–1939 and 1939–1940 he was Minister of Agriculture.

References

1892 births
1941 deaths
People from Põltsamaa Parish
People from Kreis Dorpat
Estonian Lutherans
Farmers' Assemblies politicians
Patriotic League (Estonia) politicians
Agriculture ministers of Estonia 
Members of the Riigikogu, 1920–1923
Members of the Riigikogu, 1923–1926
Members of the Riigikogu, 1926–1929
Members of the Riigikogu, 1929–1932
Members of the Riigikogu, 1932–1934
Members of the Estonian National Assembly
Members of the Riigivolikogu
Estonian people who died in Soviet detention
People who died in the Gulag